Matthew Stanley McKenzie (17 May 1890 – 8 December 1915) was an Australian first-class cricketer and Australian rules footballer.

Family
The son of Henry McKenzie (1850–1929), and Jane Danks McKenzie, née Young, Matthew Stanley McKenzie was born in Launceston, Tasmania on 17 May 1890.

His brother, George Frank McKenzie (1892-), was awarded the Distinguished Conduct Medal in 1915.

Education
He was educated at Scotch College, Launceston.

Cricket
A right-handed opening batsman, he played five first-class matches for Tasmania between 1910 and 1913.

Football
McKenzie was also an accomplished footballer, and he represented Tasmania at the 1911 Adelaide Carnival. He played club football for Launceston in the Northern Tasmanian Football Association in the early 1910s. He was part of the team which forfeited the 1913 Tasmanian State Premiership match, and he along with team-mates were consequently issued amateur sports suspensions by the Tasmanian Football League, which became a major off-field dispute between Northern Tasmania and Southern Tasmania in the months that followed. In the fall-out, when McKenzie was selected by the Northern Tasmanian Cricket Association (which refused to recognise the validity of the suspension) to play for the North XI in an intrastate cricket match against the South XI team in December 1913, the South called off the match.

He moved to Victoria at the start of 1914, and joined both the Carlton Football Club and the Carlton Cricket Club. His senior VFL career with Carlton did not begin until June 1914, when the dispute in Tasmania had ended and his suspension was lifted. He played 14 VFL games for the year, including a Preliminary Final, but he was omitted from the winning 1914 Grand Final team on form. McKenzie's final game for Carlton was in the 1914 Championship of Australia match against .

Military service
McKenzie enlisted with the First AIF (on 17 November 1914) as a medical orderly. He was a Sergeant with the 1st Australian Clearing Hospital, First A.I.F., and spent some time at Gallipoli before being moved to Alexandria in Egypt.

Death
He died of appendicitis on the hospital ship HMHS Gloucester Castle, in Alexandria Harbour, Egypt, on 8 December 1915, and was buried at the Alexandria (Chatby) Military Cemetery.

See also
 List of Tasmanian representative cricketers
 List of cricketers who were killed during military service
 List of Victorian Football League players who died in active service

Footnotes

References
 Main, J. & Allen, D., "McKenzie, Stan", pp. 125–128 in Main, J. & Allen, D., Fallen – The Ultimate Heroes: Footballers Who Never Returned From War, Crown Content, (Melbourne), 2002. 
 World War One Embarkation Roll: Private Matthew Stanley McKenzie (1459), Collection of the Australian War Memorial.
 World War One Service Record: Sergeant Matthew Stanley McKenzie (1459), National Archives of Australia.
 Roll of Honour: Sergeant Matthew Stanley McKenzie (1459), Australian War Memorial.
 Roll of Honour Circular: Sergeant Matthew Stanley McKenzie (1459), Collection of the Australian War Memorial.
   Sergeant Matthew Stanley McKenzie (1459), Commonwealth War Graves Commission.
 Australian Casualties: 129th List Issued: Died of Illness: Tasmania: Sgt. M. S. McKenzie, The Argus, (Tuesday, 4 January 1916), p.8.
 Matthew Stanley McKenzie, at Tasmanian War Casualties.

External links

 Blueseum Biography: Stan McKenzie
 CricketArchive profile

1890 births
1915 deaths
Australian Army soldiers
Australian cricketers
Australian military personnel killed in World War I
Australian rules footballers from Launceston, Tasmania
Carlton Football Club players
Cricketers from Launceston, Tasmania
Launceston Football Club players
Tasmania cricketers